Vitagliano is a surname. Notable people with the surname include:

Gioacchino Vitagliano (1669–1739), Sicilian Baroque sculptor
Juan Vitagliano, Argentine footballer
Ottavia Vitagliano (1894–1975), Italian writer, editor, and publisher

See also
Meanings of minor planet names: 5001–6000#368